María Pacheco (c. 1496 – March 1531) was a leader in the Revolt of the Comuneros in Spain, an uprising of the citizens against the monarchy.

She was born in Granada, the daughter of Íñigo López de Mendoza y Quiñones and Francisca Pacheco and a member of the House of Mendoza.

She would go on to marry Juan López de Padilla, yet kept her family name because it held a higher prestige than her husband's.

When her husband, the chief of the Comuneros, was captured and killed in the battle of Villalar in 1521, she took command in his name and successfully led the defence of the city of Toledo against the royalist forces until the arrangement of a peaceful surrender of the city six months later.

Pacheco managed to escape to Portugal, and lived in Oporto till her death, in March 1531, aged about 35. She was buried in Oporto Cathedral.

References

 Connell, Abigail, (2018). Juana I of Castile and Maria Pacheco: Leadership and Power in Early Modern Spain. Student Symposium. 4.
 Martínez Gil, Fernando (2005). María Pacheco: la mujer valerosa, historia de doña María Pacheco, comunera de Castilla (1497-1531). Volumen 3 de Biografías Castilla-La Mancha. Almud / Centro de Estudios de Castilla-La Mancha, D.L. (Ciudad Real). .
 

1490s births
1531 deaths
People from Granada
Women in 16th-century warfare
Toledo, Spain
Women in war in Spain
People of the Revolt of the Comuneros